"A Hearth's Warming Tail"  is the eighth episode of the sixth season of the animated television series My Little Pony: Friendship Is Magic, and the 125th episode of the series overall. It was directed by Denny Lu and Tim Stuby, written by Michael Vogel, and produced by Devon Cody. The episode first aired on May 14, 2016, on Discovery Family.

In "A Hearth's Warming Tail", as Ponyville gets ready to celebrate Hearth's Warming (the series' lore equivalent to Christmas) in Twilight Sparkle (Tara Strong)'s castle, Starlight Glimmer (Kelly Sheridan) prefers not to be a part of the festivities. To convince her of the importance of Hearth's Warming, Twilight and Spike (Cathy Weseluck) tell her the tale of Snowfall Frost, a cold-hearted unicorn who despises Hearth's Warming and swears to erase it with her magic.

The episode mainly consists of a depiction of the tale itself, with its characters being represented by the main characters of the show. It is adapted from Charles Dickens' classic 1843 Christmas novel A Christmas Carol, with Snowfall Frost representing Ebenezer Scrooge and being visited by three spirits who wish to teach her the importance of the holiday. "A Hearth's Warming Tail" has been described as one of the series' few true "musical episodes", and features six songs composed by Daniel Ingram and orchestrated by Caleb Chan, with lyrics by Vogel and Ingram.

The episode received acclaim from critics and fans; its pacing and songs were widely praised, in particular, "Luna's Future", which marks the first solo song for Princess Luna (from vocals by Aloma Steele).

Plot
The ponies of Ponyville prepare to celebrate Hearth's Warming together in Twilight's castle. However, when Twilight and Spike ask Starlight if she is ready to celebrate, she says she "might just skip it", as she considers it "a day dedicated to presents and candy". Twilight tries to explain that Hearth's Warming is mostly about spending time with friends and family, but Starlight is still not interested. To convince her, Twilight decides to read her favorite holiday story, A Hearth's Warming Tale.

The tale takes place during a Hearth's Warming many years ago and centers around a cold-hearted stingy unicorn mage named Snowfall Frost, who believes the holiday to be a waste of time and just an excuse to party when it could be used for more practical reasons and doesn't believe the holiday's origins when the three pony tribes joined in friendship to drive back the Windigos that were causing winter storms. After accidentally granting her assistant Snowdash, portrayed by Rainbow Dash, a holiday leave, Snowfall decides to use her magic to cast a spell to erase the holiday forever.

A few minutes later and right before she can cast her spell, the Spirit of Hearth's Warming Past, portrayed by Applejack, appears in front of her. To change her mind about the holiday, the ghost travels with Snowfall to her own childhood. Snowfall witnesses her younger self enjoying the holiday before being told by her professor that the holiday's origin is a lie, and in order to become the powerful unicorn she wants to be, she has to spend Hearth's Warming studying instead of celebrating. Taking her professor's words to heart, Snowfall then disregards Hearth's Warming altogether and isolates herself from all the other ponies to focus only on her work.

The adult Snowfall wakes up in her home back in her time, only to be visited by the Spirit of Hearth's Warming Presents, portrayed by Pinkie Pie, who teaches her the importance of presents is the pleasure to give to and receive from loved ones and she shows her the other ponies, including Snowdash and her friends Merry and Flutterholly, portrayed by Rarity and Fluttershy, respectively, enjoying their time together and making fun of Snowfall's seriousness. Snowfall suddenly finds herself in a deserted land covered in snow, where she encounters the Spirit of Hearth's Warming Yet to Come, portrayed by Princess Luna, who tells her that she will succeed in erasing the holiday, thus permitting the return of the Windigos and covering Equestria in a blanket of eternal snow.

Horrified by the consequences her spell would have, Snowfall awakens once again in the present, realizing the future can still be avoided. She joins the other ponies in their celebration of Hearth's Warming, understanding the importance of the holiday. Finishing the story, Twilight encourages Starlight to join them in the celebration, which she does, and all of Ponyville celebrates Hearth's Warming together.

Cast
 Kelly Sheridan as Starlight Glimmer/Snowfall Frost, a stingy, cynical and arrogant pony, whose sheer miserly nature leads her to reject Heart's Warming and all things which engender happiness with a passion.
 Ashleigh Ball as Applejack/Ghost of Heart's Warming Past, the first spirit that haunts Frost in order to prompt her to repent. 
 Andrea Libman as Pinkie Pie/Ghost of Heart's Warming Presents, the second spirit. She is depicted as a towering pony with pink hair, a candy laurel wreath, and a yellow ermine robe.
 Shannon Chan-Kent, Pinkie Pie's singing voice.
 Tabitha St. Germain as Princess Luna/Ghost of Heart's Warming Yet to Come, the third and final spirit. She is depicted as a shadowy Grim Reaper.
 Aloma Steele, Princess Luna's singing voice.
 Ashleigh Ball as Rainbow Dash/Snowdash, Frost's optimistic and kindly assistant.
 Andrea Libman as Fluttershy/Flutterholly, one of Snowdash's friends at the party.
 Tabitha St. Germain as Rarity/Merry, one of Snowdash's friends at the party.
 William Samples as Professor Flintheart, Snowfall Frost's firm teacher from her childhood.
 Tara Strong as Twilight Sparkle, the Narrator.
 Rebecca Shoichet, Twilight Sparkle's singing voice.
 Cathy Weseluck as Spike.

Songs

Production and promotion
The opening song of the episode, "Hearth's Warming Eve Is Here Once Again", was first previewed at the 2016 New York Toy Fair.

According to writer Michael Vogel, in the original version of the script, the character of Jacob Marley from A Christmas Carol was planned to appear, and would have been represented by Discord; this was cut to save time for rest of the plot. Also in the episode's original draft, Princess Luna's Spirit of Hearth's Warming Future did not have a song due to a lack of space in the episode's running time, but the "directors and creative team all realized she needed one".

The animation sequences for the songs "Hearth's Warming Eve Is Here Once Again", "Say Goodbye to the Holiday", and "Luna's Future" were storyboarded by Sabrina Alberghetti.

Reception
The episode received acclaim. Daniel Avarez of Unleash the Fanboy highly praised the episode, giving it a perfect rating of 10 out of 10. He praised the "fantastic songs", the episode itself as "A solid Christmas tale", as it "takes the overused Christmas Carol plot but manages to be great anyway." He was also receptive of the use of songs to enhance the story rather than distract, as well as the story arc of Starlight's redemption. Don't Hate the Geek called the episode "amazing", describing Luna's appearance as the Spirit of Hearth's Warming Yet to Come and her song as show stealers.

Daniel Ingram was nominated for a 2017 Leo Award for his work on this episode for "Best Musical Score in an Animation Program or Series".

Home media release
All songs in the episode (excluding "Hearth's Warming Eve is Here Once Again (Reprise)") were released as a part of the 2016 physical and digital re-release of the 2015 compilation album It's a Pony Kind of Christmas.

See also
 Adaptations of A Christmas Carol

Notes

References

External links
 

My Little Pony: Friendship Is Magic episodes
2016 American television episodes
2016 Canadian television episodes
Musical television episodes
Television shows based on A Christmas Carol
American Christmas television episodes